Hans-Jürgen is a given name. Notable people with the name include:

Hans-Jürgen Abt of Abt Sportsline, a motor racing and auto tuning company based in Kempten im Allgäu, Germany
Hans-Jürgen von Arnim (1889–1962), German colonel-general (Generaloberst) who served during World War II
Hans-Jürgen Baake (born 1954), retired German footballer
Hans-Jürgen Bäsler (1938–2002), German footballer
Hans-Jürgen Bäumler (born 1942), German pair skater, actor, singer and television host
Hans-Jürgen Berger (born 1951), German former long jumper who competed in the 1976 Summer Olympics
Hans-Jürgen von Blumenthal (1907–1944), German aristocrat and Army officer in World War II
Hans-Jürgen Bode (born 1941), former West German handball player who competed in the 1972 Summer Olympics
Hans-Jürgen Bombach (born 1945), former sprinter who specialized in the 100 and 200 metres
Hans-Jürgen Borchers (1926–2011), mathematical physicist at the Georg-August-Universität Göttingen
Hans-Jürgen von Bose (born 1953), German composer
Hans-Jürgen Boysen (born 1957), German former football player who was most recently manager of SV Sandhausen
Hans-Jürgen Bradler (born 1948), retired German football goalkeeper
Hans-Jürgen Buchner (born 1944), Bavarian songwriter, singer, and musician
Hans-Jürgen Dollheiser (born 1928), German former field hockey player who competed in the 1952 Summer Olympics
Hans-Jürgen Dörner (born 1951), former German football player and who now coaches
Hans Jurgen Eysenck (1916–1997), psychologist born in Germany, who spent his professional career in Great Britain
Hans-Jürgen Felsen (born 1940), German former sprinter
Hans-Jürgen Gede (born 1956), German football coach and former player
Hans-Jürgen Gerhardt (born 1954), East German bobsledder who competed in the late 1970s and early 1980s
Hans-Jürgen Gundelach (born 1963), retired German football player
Hans-Jürgen Hehn (born 1944), German fencer
Hans-Jürgen Jansen (born 1941), retired German footballer
Hans Jürgen Kiebach (1930–1995), German production designer, art director and set decorator
Hans-Jürgen Klein (born 1952), German politician for the Alliance '90/The Greens
Hans-Jürgen Köper (born 1951), German football manager and former midfielder
Hans-Jürgen Kreische (born 1947), former East German footballer
Hans-Jürgen Krupp (born 1933), German politician, economist, professor and former president of the University of Frankfurt
Hans-Jürgen Krysmanski (born 1935), German sociologist, falsely stated to have been a member of the German Communist Party
Hans-Jürgen Kurrat (born 1944), retired German football striker
Hans Jürgen Massaquoi (1926–2013), German American journalist and author
Hans-Jürgen Merten (1946–2005), pilot of Helios Airways Flight 522 that crashed into a mountain in Greece on 14 August 2005
Hans-Jurgen Muller (born 1955), German television and movie actor
Hans-Jürgen Papier (born 1943), German scholar of constitutional law, President of the Federal Constitutional Court of Germany 2002–2010
Hans-Jürgen Pohmann (born 1947), former professional tennis player from Germany
Hans Jürgen Press (1926–2002), German illustrator and writer of children's books
Hans-Jürgen Riediger (born 1955), former German soccer player
Hans-Jürgen Riemenschneider (born 1949), West German sprint canoeist
Hans-Jürgen Ripp (1946–2021), German football player
Hans-Jürgen Salewski (born 1956), former professional German footballer
Hans-Jürgen Schatz (born 1958), German television actor
Hans-Jürgen Schlieker (1924–2004), German abstract painter, grouped with Hans Hartung, Bernard Schultze and Emil Schumacher
Hans-Jürgen Stammer (born 1899), German zoologist, ecologist and director of the Zoological Institute of the University Erlangen
Hans-Jürgen Stumpff (1889–1968), German general of the Luftwaffe during the Second World War
Hans-Jürgen Sundermann (born 1940), German manager and former footballer
Hans-Jürgen Syberberg (born 1935), German film director, whose best known film is his lengthy feature, Hitler: A Film from Germany
Hans-Jurgen Tiemann (born 1974), race driver from Germany
Hans-Jürgen Tode (born 1957), East German sprint canoeist
Hans Jürgen Todt (born 1937), German modern pentathlete
Hans-Jürgen Tritschoks (born 1955), German football manager
Hans-Jürgen Veil (born 1946), German former wrestler who competed in the 1972 Summer Olympics and in the 1976 Summer Olympics
Hans-Jürgen Wallbrecht (1943–1970), German rower who competed for the Unified Team of Germany in the 1964 Summer Olympics
Hans-Jürgen Walter (born 1944), German psychologist and psychotherapist known as the main founder of Gestalt Theoretical Psychotherapy
Hans-Jürgen Weber (born 1955), former football referee from Germany
Hans-Jürgen Wischnewski (1922–2005), German Social Democrat politician
Hans-Jürgen Wittkamp (born 1947), retired German football player
Hans-Jürgen Wloka (born 1951), retired German football player